Grant Sheehan is a New Zealand photographer and publisher, raised in Nelson and now based in Wellington.

Sheehan’s photographs have featured in magazines and newspapers such as Condé Nast Traveler and the New York Times, and in over 24 books, including The Night Watchers: New Zealand Landscapes, Eye in the Sky: A Drone Above New Zealand, Landmarks – Historic Buildings of New Zealand; Cafés of the World, the internationally successful series A Place to Stay – Hotels of the World, Planet Penguin and New Zealand Landscapes from Northland to Antarctica. He has twice won the New Zealand Travel Photographer of the Year Award (2002 and 2008), with images from international assignments. His work has been exhibited in galleries and museums.

Sheehan’s son Rhian Sheehan is a New Zealand composer and producer.

Awards 

 2013 Pride in Print, Gold Medal award in Publishing Category, Process Category and Gold award overall winner, Ghosts in the landscape
 2011 Winner, Travcom Pictorial Travel Book of the year award New Zealand Landscapes, Northland to Antarctica
 2009 Runner-up, Cathay Pacific Travel Photographer of the Year Award
 2009 Runner-up, Highly Commended Jucy Rentals Award for the Best Travel Image Taken In New Zealand and Pacific Islands
 2008 Winner, Cathay Pacific Travel Photographer of the Year Award
 2008 Runner-up, The Leica Award for the Best Travel Image Taken Outside New Zealand
 2008 Highly Commended, The Air Vanuatu and Le Meridian Port Vila Resort & Casino Award for the Best Series of Travel Images
 2004 Third place, Avis Award for Best New Zealand Image
 2002 Winner, Cathay Pacific Travel Photographer of the Year Award
 1998 Runner-up, Travcom Maui Travel Photographer of the Year with the Sheraton Auckland Hotel and Towers
 1997 Runner-up, American Express and Sheraton Auckland Hotel and Towers Award Photographic Award

Notable exhibitions 

 2014 Ghosts in the Landscape. Black and white photographs. Bottle Creek Gallery, Pataka, Porirua
 2012 Ghosts in the Landscape. Black and white photographs, Photographers Gallery, Hawke's Bay
 2012 Ghosts in the Landscape. Black and white photographs, New Zealand landscape, Hedspace, Masterton.
 2009 Antarctic Images, Photographs of Antarctic from the Sea – Joint exhibition, Bowen Gallery, Wellington.
 2008 Photo Synthesis – New Photographs, Bowen Gallery, Wellington. 
 1994 Five Photographers  – Works by five photographers, supported by Tradenz, Beijing, China.
 1994 Lest We Forget – Wellington Photographers, Wellington City Art Gallery, Wellington.
 1992 New Zealand Dance: Works by various photographers – toured nationally by the Regional Arts Council.
 1989 Leading Lights, Light Houses of New Zealand – A documentation of New Zealand’s lighthouses – toured nationally by Tower Corporation.
 1989 Works on Walls – Southern Cross Gallery, Auckland. 
 1988 Historic Wellington Buildings – Funded by Historic Places Trust, Antrim House, Wellington.
 1983 Wellington Photographs – one-person show, Wellington City Art Gallery, Wellington.

Selected publications 

 2017 The Night Watchers: New Zealand Landscapes, text and photography by Grant Sheehan, Phantom House Books, 
 2017 Lucy goes to the Lighthouse, text by Grant Sheehan, illustration by Rosalind Clark, Phantom House Books, 
 2016 Coffee U Feel: The Havana Coffee Works Story, Text Geoff Marsland with Tom Scott, Principal Photography by Grant Sheehan, Phantom House Books, 
2016 Ivan And the Lighthouse, text by Grant Sheehan, illustration by Rosalind Clark, Phantom House Books, 
 2015 Eye in the Sky: A Drone Above New Zealand, text and photography by Grant Sheehan, Phantom House Books, 
 2013 Lights in the Landscape: New Zealand Lighthouses, text and photography by Grant Sheehan, Phantom House Books, 
 2012 The Second Black Dog Cottage Cookbook, text Adie McClelland, principal Photography by Grant Sheehan, Phantom House Books, 
 2011 Ghosts in the Landscape, text and photography by Grant Sheehan, Phantom House Books, 
 2010 Morning Noon & Night - Floriditas Café, Restaurant & Bakery, text Julie Clark and Marc Weir, photography by Grant Sheehan, Phantom House Books,

References

Further reading 
Grant Sheehan, Eye in the Sky: A Drone Above New Zealand, F11 Magazine, Issue 50 Dec/Jan 2016
Grant Sheehan, Lights in the Landscape: New Zealand Lighthouses, F11 Magazine, Issue 28 Dec/Jan 2014
Ghosts in the Landscape, interview with Grant Sheehan, F11 Magazine, Issue 6 Dec/Jan 2012

External links 
Gallery
Grant Sheehan's website

Year of birth missing (living people)
Living people
New Zealand photographers
New Zealand publishers (people)